Lauri Pirhonen, born 3 July 1984, is a Finnish footballer goalkeeper currently playing for FC Jazz in the Finnish second tier Ykkönen.

Junnila has previously played 25 matches in the Finnish premier division Veikkausliiga for FC Jazz. He was a member of the Finland squad at the 2001 European U-16 Championship.

References 

1984 births
People from Noormarkku
Finnish footballers
Association football goalkeepers
Veikkausliiga players
FC Jazz players
Porin Palloilijat players
FC KooTeePee players
Living people
Musan Salama players
Sportspeople from Satakunta